Hercules and the Circle of Fire is the third television movie in the syndicated fantasy series Hercules: The Legendary Journeys.

In the film, when all the Earth's fire begins to go out, Hercules and Deianeira must go in search for fire to stop the world from becoming frozen.

Plot
Hercules is walking through a snowy mountain top where he finds a woman in the cold and goes to help her. He sees Zeus in a cave, and a rock closes over the entrance. Hercules turns around, and the woman calls out to him and freezes and explodes. Hercules wakes from a dream. He turns over and goes back to sleep. As he sleeps, his campfire goes out. The next day Hercules and young man are walking through a cave with dead bodies strewn all over. The man tells Hercules that they are all men from his village and that the witch who guards the Fountain of Youth killed them for their youth and strength. At the heart of the cave they find an old woman. Hercules sees she is chained up, and is hit over the head by the man, who is actually a warlock. He says to Hercules he will now have Hercules' strength. Hercules and the warlock fight and the warlock appears invincible, but then Hercules notices a beating heart among the items in the warlock's cave. Hercules rips the warlock's shirt  and sees that the heart belongs to the warlock. Hercules takes a knife and plunges it into the heart and kills the warlock. With the warlock now dead, the old woman reverts to her true form, that of a young woman. Hercules frees the woman from her chains and takes some water from the fountain. After this the fountain begins to boil and begins dissolving everything in the cave. Hercules grabs the woman and they leave the cave. Outside the cave Zeus appears and Hercules tells Zeus the water will cure Chiron of his wound.
Later Hercules arrives at Chiron's house, he gives him the water and he drinks it. The wound heals, but after a few seconds the wound worsens. Hercules tells him he will find a cure for his wound. Meanwhile, all over the village fires are being inexplicably extinguished. Hercules and Chiron are talking by the fire side and the fire goes out. Hercules realizes that something is amiss. He decides to investigate. He approaches Hera's temple which still has fire. A woman is trying to persuade the priest of the temple to let them light their torches, the priest refuses. Hercules kicks down the door, Hera's priest fight him, he beats them, and lights the torch. Three women appear and tell Hercules that the torch is of no use, because Hera has stolen the Eternal Torch and plans to kill mankind once and for all. Hercules knows that humans cannot survive without fire, and if he does not get the Torch back all life will die. Later on the woman from the temple comes to Chiron, it is revealed she is Deianeira. Chiron says only Hercules can help her and points  her the man from the temple. Hercules says they need to talk to Prometheus, so he and Deianeira set off. They find Prometheus frozen, he says that Hera has stolen the Eternal Torch and that Hercules must get it back. Hercules and Deianeira travel onto Mount Aepion, where Hera has the Torch. While traveling, Hercules is attacked by a giant named Antaeus and with the help of Deianeira manages to kill him.

As they camp for the night, Hercules reveals to Deianeira that he was the one who accidentally inflicted Chiron's wound. The next day as they are crossing a gorge they arrive at a point where Hera has removed the bridge. Hercules says they can continue if they use the rope which still remains. Deianeira reluctantly agrees. The two finally arrive at Mount Aepion, Hercules walks through the snowy mountain top, just like in his dream. He finds Zeus and Hercules asks him what Hera has done. Zeus says that Hera has put the Torch in the center of a ring of fire, and the fire has the power to kill immortals. Zeus warns Hercules from going through with his plan to get the Torch back. Hercules says he will do it anyway. The two men battle it out and Zeus tells Hercules that he is trying to save him. Hercules asks his father if he cares about humanity, Zeus replies that he does, but he loves Hercules more. Hercules tells Zeus he loves him too. Zeus accepts what Hercules must do, and lets him go. Hercules goes through the fire and retrieves the Torch, he throws it and it lands in Prometheus's home waking him. Fire begins to return. As Hercules lays dying in the circle, Zeus begs Hera not to harm Hercules or he will haunt her for eternity, and even threatening to give up his own immortality. Hera stops the flames and Zeus helps Hercules, who thanks him for saving his life. Before leaving the cage Hercules picks up a stick and makes a torch. Zeus asks if he knows the power of the flames, Hercules acknowledges that he does. Hercules takes the torch to Chiron's house and asks him to step inside a circle of straw. Chiron stands in the center of the circle and Hercules lights the straw with the torch. Chiron drops to his knees and cries out. As the flames die out Chiron exclaims that his wound is healed, the flames had burned away his immortality and healed the wound.

Cast
 Kevin Sorbo as Hercules
 Anthony Quinn as Zeus
 Tawny Kitaen as Deianeira
 Mark Ferguson as Prometheus
 Kevin Atkinson as Cheiron
 Stephanie Barrett as Phaedra
 Kerry Gallagher as Amalthea

Production
This movie is loosely based on the myth of Prometheus. The basic plot concept of Prometheus being captured, is similar to the first season Xena: Warrior Princess episode "Prometheus", although in that episode mankind is robbed of the gift of healing not fire. The clip of Prometheus was used for the opening title sequence of the television series.

External links
 

Hercules: The Legendary Journeys
Films set in ancient Greece
New Zealand television films
Films about Heracles
Films directed by Doug Lefler